New Frankfurt (German: Neues Frankfurt) was an affordable public housing program in Frankfurt started in 1925 and completed in 1930. It was also the name of the accompanying magazine that was published from 1926 to 1931 dedicated to international trends in architecture, art, housing and education.

History
The project was initiated by Frankfurt's mayor Ludwig Landmann, who hired the architect Ernst May as a general manager of many communal departments. Renowned architects like Max Cetto, Martin Elsaesser, Walter Gropius, Ferdinand Kramer, Adolf Meyer, Bruno Taut, Margarete Schütte-Lihotzky and Mart Stam worked in Frankfurt.

Under May 12,000 apartments were built, 2,000 more than planned. The buildings not only met the basic needs of housing, they set standards for urban development and design but also broke with house building tradition. All apartments and mansions were equipped with a Frankfurt kitchen. Catherine Bauer Wurster visited the buildings in 1930 and was inspired by the work of May.

Nazi critics denigrated the project as "Mr May's small Soviet industry" and Joseph Goebbels called Ernst May the "Lenin of German architecture", even if it is told that he loved the modern architecture. The Nazis stopped all construction activities and presented the estates to foreign visitors as their own new Nationalsocialist architecture. Most employees of the project left Germany after 1933, some of them followed Ernst May to the Soviet Union, which invited teams of famous architects, like Le Corbusier and from the Bauhaus to work there.

After some demolitions of houses designed by Mart Stam and protest, the estates were declared protected landmarks in the late 1970s.

One two-storey terrace house was renovated and restored into the standard of 1928 by the Ernst May Society, it is called the Ernst May House and is a museum today. The reconstruction was underpinned by research by architectural historians.

Selected projects

Villa May, Frankfurt am Main, 1925
Villa Elsaesser, Frankfurt am Main, 1925–1926
Estate Höhenblick, Frankfurt am Main, 1926–1927
Estate Bruchfeldstraße (Zickzackhausen), Frankfurt am Main, 1926–1927	
Estate Riederwald, Frankfurt am Main, 1926–1927
Estate Praunheim, Frankfurt am Main, 1926–1928
Estate Römerstadt, Frankfurt am Main, 1926–1928
Estate Bornheimer Hang, Frankfurt am Main, 1926–1930
Estate Heimatsiedlung, Frankfurt am Main, 1927–1934
Estate Hellerhof, Frankfurt am Main, 1929–1932
Röderberg school, Frankfurt am Main, 1929–1930
Estate Westhausen, Frankfurt am Main, 1929–1931
House in Dornbusch, Frankfurt am Main, 1927–1931

Literature

See also
Berlin Modernism Housing Estates, Berlin 1926
Bauhaus and its Sites in Weimar, Dessau and Bernau, 1923–1930
Weissenhof Estate, Stuttgart, 1927
Frankfurter Küche

References

External links 

Exhibition "Modernism in Frankfurt, 1919–1933"
 May's housing project
 Website of the Ernst-May-Society

Buildings and structures in Frankfurt
Housing in Germany
Public housing
Architecture in Germany
1920s architecture
Modernist architecture in Germany
Heritage sites in Hesse